The 1938 San Francisco State States football team represented San Francisco State College—now known as San Francisco State University—as an independent during the 1938 college football season. Led by Dan Farmer and Hal Hardin in their fourth and final season as co-head coaches, San Francisco State compiled a record of 2–5 and was outscored by its opponents 79 to 53. The team played home games at Roberts Field in San Francisco. Although the "Gator" was voted to be the mascot for the team in 1931, local newspaper articles called the team the "Staters" from 1935 through 1940.

Schedule

Notes

References

San Francisco State
San Francisco State Gators football seasons
San Francisco State Staters football